The Golden bowl of Hasanlu is a historical object made of gold. It was discovered by Robert H. Dyson in 1958 while excavating the site of Teppeh Hasanlu, near the city of Naghadeh, northwest of Iran. The bowl is estimated to be around 3200 years or older.

References

Further reading
 

Archaeological discoveries in Iran
Medes
Gold objects
Iranian art
Teppe Hasanlu
1958 in Iran
1958 archaeological discoveries